STS-32 was the 33rd mission of NASA's Space Shuttle program, and the ninth launch of . Launched on January 9, 1990, it marked the first use of the Launch Complex 39A of Kennedy Space Center at since 1986; it also marked the first use of Mobile Launcher Platform-3 (MLP-3) in the Space Shuttle program. STS-32 was, at the time, the longest shuttle mission yet conducted, with a duration of nearly 11 days. Before STS-32, the only mission of the same duration had been STS-9 in 1983. On January 20, 1990, STS-32 executed the third night landing of the shuttle program. STS-32 was also the first Shuttle mission of the 1990s.

The mission was technically designated STS-32R, as the original STS-32 designator had been used internally for STS-61-C, the 24th Space Shuttle mission. Official documentation and flight paperwork for that mission had contained the designator STS-32 throughout. Flights with the STS-26 through STS-33 designators used the R in their documentation to avoid conflicts in tracking data from one mission to another.

Crew

Crew seating arrangements

Launch preparations 
Launch Complex 39A was modified extensively in preparation for the launch, with STS-32 being the first launch from the refurbished pad since STS-61-C in 1986. NASA made improvements to the crew emergency egress system and the shuttle payload room, increased anti-freeze protection for the water systems, installed debris traps used during propellant loading, and added more weather protection features and an umbilical to provide power, instrumentation and controls to the heaters for the solid rocket booster (SRB) field joints.

MLP-3, the oldest of the three Apollo-era launch structures, also underwent extensive remodeling for use with the shuttle. These modifications included the removal of the umbilical tower, the reconfiguring of three exhaust holes, and amendments to the electrical and mechanical ground support systems.

Mission summary 

STS-32 launched from Kennedy Space Center (KSC), Florida, on January 9, 1990, at 7:35:00 a.m. EST. The launch was initially scheduled for December 18, 1989, but was later postponed to allow the modifications to Pad A to be completed and verified. The second scheduled launch, on January 8, 1990, was aborted due to weather conditions. Columbia had a mission launch weight of  
 
The primary objectives of the mission were to deploy the Syncom IV-F5 military communications satellite (also known as Leasat 5), and to retrieve NASA's Long Duration Exposure Facility (LDEF), whose retrieval had been delayed for 4 years by scheduling changes and the Challenger disaster of 1986. Syncom IV-F5 (Leasat-5) was deployed on the second flight day, and a third-stage Minuteman solid apogee kick motor propelled it into a geosynchronous orbit. Dunbar retrieved the LDEF on the fourth day of the flight using the shuttle's Remote Manipulator System (Canadarm). The timeliness of the retrieval was of critical importance, because a high rate of solar flux had increased the density of the LDEF's orbital environment and accelerated its rate of orbital decay. Specialists who carefully monitored the stability of the craft's orbit had anticipated that if the LDEF was not retrieved in time, it would pass too low for the shuttle to safely reach, and could be destroyed during re-entry in February 1990. Thus, the mission's exact liftoff time was determined about 12 hours before launch, using the latest tracking data on LDEF. It was flown on a  orbit inclined 28.45° to the equator.

The crew performed a 4-hour photographic survey of the free-flying structure, which held 57 science, technology and applications experiments. The 12-sided cylinder, about the size of a small satellite bus, was then berthed in the orbiter's payload bay for return to Earth.

NASA had planned to acquire data on the crew members' exposure to long periods of zero gravity, and its effects on the crew's performance while landing the orbiter after an extended mission. STS-32 set a new shuttle duration record of nearly eleven days. An orbiter kit was developed to allow the shuttle to operate for up to 16 days in Earth orbit, and would later make its debut on Columbias STS-50 mission in 1992.

The retrieval of LDEF was filmed with an IMAX camera, and appeared in the IMAX film Destiny in Space in 1994. Earth observation footage from the camera also appeared in the 1990 film Blue Planet.

Columbia landed safely on January 20, 1990, at 1:35:37 a.m. PST on Runway 22 of Edwards Air Force Base, California. The orbiter returned to KSC on January 26, 1990.

Mid-deck payloads 
In addition to the Syncom IV-F5 (Leasat-5) satellite, STS-32 carried a number of mid-deck scientific payloads, some of which had already been flown on previous shuttle missions. The experiments included:

Wake-up calls 
NASA began a tradition of playing music to astronauts during the Project Gemini, and first used music to wake up a flight crew during Apollo 15. Each track is specially chosen, often by the astronauts' families, and usually has a special meaning to an individual member of the crew, or is applicable to their daily activities.

Mission insignia 
The three stars on the left and two stars on the right of STS-32's insignia symbolized the flight's numerical designation in the Space Transportation System's mission sequence. The inverted orbiter on the mission patch reflects the overhead phasing required for rendezvous with LDEF. LDEF had dropped to such a low altitude that the orbiter could not do the usual lower-orbit catch-up because of the thicker atmosphere, and had to reach the LDEF from above.

See also 

 List of human spaceflights
 List of Space Shuttle missions

References

External links 
 NASA mission information 
 STS-32 Video Highlights 

Space Shuttle missions
Edwards Air Force Base
Spacecraft launched in 1990